A distress signal, also known as a distress call, is an internationally recognized means for obtaining help. Distress signals are communicated by transmitting radio signals, displaying a visually observable item or illumination, or making a sound audible from a distance.

A distress signal indicates that a person or group of people, ship, aircraft, or other vehicle is threatened by a serious or imminent danger and requires immediate assistance. Use of distress signals in other circumstances may be against local or international law. An urgency signal is available to request assistance in less critical situations.

For distress signalling to be the most effective, two parameters must be communicated:
 Alert or notification of an emergency in progress
 Position or location (or localization or pinpointing) of the party in distress.

For example, a single aerial flare alerts observers to the existence of a vessel in distress somewhere in the general direction of the flare sighting on the horizon but extinguishes within one minute or less.  A hand-held flare burns for three minutes and can be used to localize or pinpoint more precisely the exact location or position of the party in trouble.  An EPIRB both notifies or alerts authorities and at the same time provides position indication information.

Maritime 
Distress signals at sea are defined in the International Regulations for Preventing Collisions at Sea and in the International Code of Signals. Mayday signals must only be used where there is grave and imminent danger to life. Otherwise, urgent signals such as pan-pan can be sent. Most jurisdictions have large penalties for false, unwarranted, or prank distress signals.

Distress can be indicated by any of the following officially sanctioned methods:

 Transmitting a spoken voice Mayday message by radio over very high frequency channel 16 (156.8 MHz) or medium frequency on 2182 kHz
 Transmitting a digital distress signal by activating (or pressing) the distress button on a marine radio equipped with Digital Selective Calling (DSC) over VHF channel 70 or over another designated DSC frequency in the maritime MF and HF bands.
 Transmitting a digital distress signal by activating (or pressing) the distress button (or key) on an Inmarsat-C satellite internet device
 Sending the Morse code group SOS by light flashes or sounds
 Burning a red flare (either hand-held or aerial parachute flare)
 Launching distress rockets
 Emitting orange smoke from a canister
 Showing flames on the vessel (as from a burning tar barrel, oil barrel, etc.)
 Raising and lowering slowly and repeatedly both arms outstretched to each side
 Making a continuous sound with any  fog-signaling apparatus
 Firing a gun or other explosive signal at intervals of about a minute
 Flying the international maritime signal flags NC  
 Displaying a visual signal consisting of a square flag having above or below it a ball or anything resembling a ball (round or circular in appearance)

A floating man-overboard pole or dan buoy can be used to indicate that a person is in distress in the water and is ordinarily equipped with a yellow and red flag (international code of signals flag "O") and a flashing lamp or strobe light.

In North America, marine search and rescue agencies in Canada and the United States also recognize certain other distress signals:
 Sea marker dye
 White high-intensity strobe light flashing at 60 times per minute

Automated radio signals
In addition, distress can be signaled using automated radio signals such as a Search and Rescue Transponder (SART) which response to 9 GHz radar signal, or an Emergency Position-Indicating Radio Beacon (EPIRB) which operates in the 406 MHz radiofrequency. EPIRB signals are received and processed by a constellation of satellites known as Cospas-Sarsat. Older EPIRBs that use 121.5 MHz is obsolete. Many regulators require vessels that proceed offshore to carry an EPIRB.

Many EPIRBs have an in-built Global Positioning System receiver. When activated these EPIRBs rapidly report the latitude and longitude of the emergency accurate to within . The position of non-GPS EPIRBs is determined by the orbiting satellites, this can take ninety minutes to five hours after activation and is accurate to within . Marine safety authorities recommend the use of GPS-equipped EPIRBs.

A miniaturized EPIRB capable of being carried in crew members' clothing is called a Personal Locator Beacon (PLB). Regulators do not view them as a substitute for a vessel's EPIRB. In situations with a high risk of "man overboard", such as open ocean yacht racing, PLBs may be required by the event's organizers. PLBs are also often carried during risky outdoor activities on the land.

EPIRBs and PLBs have a unique identification number (UIN or "HexID"). A purchaser should register their EPIRB or PLB with the national search and rescue authority; this is free in most jurisdictions. EPIRB registration allows the authority to alert searchers of the vessel's name, label, type, size, and paintwork; to promptly notify next-of-kin, and to quickly resolve inadvertent activations.

A DSC radio distress signal can include the position if the lat/long are manually keyed into the radio or if a GPS-derived position is passed electronically directly into the radio.

Mayday
A Mayday message consists of the word "mayday" spoken three times in succession, which is the distress signal, followed by the distress message, which should include:
 Name of the vessel or ship in distress
 Its position (actual, last known, or estimated expressed in lat/long or in distance/bearing from a specific location)
 Nature of the vessel distress condition or situation (e.g. on fire, sinking, aground, taking on water, adrift in hazardous waters)
 Number of persons at risk or to be rescued; grave injuries
 Type of assistance needed or being sought
 Any other details to facilitate resolution of the emergency such as actions being taken (e.g. abandoning ship, pumping flood water), estimated available time remaining afloat

Unusual or extraordinary appearance 
When none of the above-described officially sanctioned signals are available, attention for assistance can be attracted by anything that appears unusual or out of the ordinary, such as a jib sail hoisted upside down.

During daylight hours when the sun is visible, a heliograph mirror can be used to flash bright, intense sunlight. Battery-powered laser lights the size of small flashlights (electric torches) are available for use in emergency signaling.

Inverted flags 
For hundreds of years inverted national flags were commonly used as distress signals. However, for some countries' flags it is difficult (e.g., Spain, South Korea, United Kingdom) or impossible (e.g., Japan, Thailand, and Israel) to determine whether they are inverted. Other countries have flags that are inverses of each other; for example, the Polish flag is white on the top half and red on the bottom, while Indonesia's and Monaco's flags are the opposite—i.e., top half red, the bottom half white. A ship flying no flags may also be understood to be in distress. For one country, the Philippines, an inverted flag is a symbol of war rather than distress. 

If any flag is available, distress may be indicated by tying a knot in it and then flying it upside-down, making it into a wheft.

Device loss and disposal 
To avoid pointless searches some devices must be reported when lost. This particularly applies to EPIRBs, lifebuoys, rafts, and devices marked with the vessel's name and port.

Expired flares should not be set off, as this indicates distress. Rather, most port authorities offer disposal facilities for expired distress pyrotechnics. In some areas special training events are organized, where the flares can be used safely.

EPIRBs must not be disposed of into general waste as discarded EPIRBs often trigger at the waste disposal facility. In 2013, the majority of EPIRB activations investigated by the Australian Maritime Safety Authority were due to the incorrect disposal of obsolete 121.5 MHz EPIRB beacons.

Aviation 

The civilian aircraft frequency for voice distress alerting is 121.5 MHz. Military aircraft use 243 MHz (which is a harmonic of 121.5 MHz, and therefore civilian beacons transmit on this frequency as well). Aircraft can also signal an emergency by setting one of several special transponder codes, such as 7700.

The COSPAS/SARSAT signal can be transmitted by an Electronic Locator Transmitter or ELT, which is similar to a marine EPIRB on the 406 MHz radiofrequency.  (Marine EPIRBs are constructed to float, while an aviation ELT is constructed to be activated by a sharp deceleration and is sometimes referred to as a Crash Position Indicator or CPI).

A "triangular distress pattern" is a rarely used flight pattern flown by aircraft in distress but without radio communications. The standard pattern is a series of 120° turns.

Schwarzwald 
The recognized mountain distress signals are based on groups of three, or six in the UK and the European Schwarzwald. A distress signal can be three fires or piles of rocks in a triangle, three blasts on a whistle, three shots from a firearm, or three flashes of light, in succession followed by a one-minute pause and repeated until a response is received. Three blasts or flashes is the appropriate response.

In the Schwarzwald, the recommended way to signal distress is the Schwarzwald distress signal: give six signals within a minute, then pause for a minute, repeating this until rescue arrives. A signal may be anything visual (waving clothes or lights, use of a signal mirror) or audible (shouts, whistles, etc.). The rescuers acknowledge with three signals per minute.

In practice, either signal pattern is likely to be recognized in most popular mountainous areas as nearby climbing teams are likely to include Europeans or North Americans.

To communicate with a helicopter in sight, raise both arms (forming the letter Y) to indicate "Yes" or "I need help," or stretch one arm up and one down (imitating the letter N) for "No" or "I do not need help".  If semaphore flags are available, they can be used to communicate with rescuers.

Ground beacons 
The COSPAS-SARSAT 406 MHz radiofrequency distress signal can be transmitted by hikers, backpackers, trekkers, mountaineers and other ground-based remote adventure seekers and personnel working in isolated backcountry areas using a small, portable Personal Locator Beacon or PLB.

See also 
 2182 kHz
 500 kHz
 COSPAS-SARSAT Search And Rescue Satellite Aided Tracking
 Digital Selective Calling DSC
 Emergency Alert System
 Emergency telephone number
 Global Maritime Distress Safety System GMDSS
 International distress frequency
 Maritime mobile amateur radio
 Mayday
 Mountain rescue
 Search and Rescue Transponder
 SOLAS Convention
 SOS
 Vessel emergency codes
 Emergency locator beacon

References

External links 
 What is the meaning of SOS?
 US Coast Guard: Visual Distress Signals for Recreational Boaters
 US Coast Guard: Flares and other Visual Distress Signals
 Transport Canada: Radio Distress Procedures Card

 
Emergency communication
Encodings
Maritime signalling
Rescue
Survival skills